José Pereira de Abreu Júnior (born 24 May 1946) is a Brazilian actor.

Biography
Born in the city of Santa Rita do Passa Quatro, in the state of São Paulo, at the age of fourteen he moved to the state's capital, São Paulo city, working as a lab assistant and office-boy for a law firm.

In 1967, while studying law at the Pontifícia Universidade Católica de São Paulo, he began his theatrical career at the Teatro da Pontifícia Universidade Católica de São Paulo, with the play Morte e Vida Severina by João Cabral de Melo Neto and Chico Buarque.

A year later, he was starring in movies, but his career came to a quick halt because of his political activism. Abreu was arrested during a meeting of the União Nacional dos Estudantes, belonged to the Ação Popular and gave logistical support to the Vanguarda Armada Revolucionária Palmares, a leftist group that fought against the military regime. He also joined the hippie movement during that time, in contrast with his militaristic actions.

Forced into exile in Europe in 1968, he returned in 1974 to live in Pelotas, state of Rio Grande do Sul, his wife's homeland. They both taught at the federal university in that city, but soon moved to Porto Alegre, where he produced musicals and starred in children's plays. With his wife, he produced the first staging of the musical Os Saltimbancos in that state.

Then, after the success of the movie A Intrusa (The Intruder) (1979), filmed in Uruguaiana, Rio Grande do Sul, he started work as an actor in TV Globo's soap-operas.

In 2006 he partnered with director Luiz Arthur Nunes to create Fala, Zé!, a theatrical monologue in which he critically reflects on his generation, crossing biography and fiction.

In 2011 he played Milton in the soap-opera Insensato Coração; in 2012, the character Nilo in Avenida Brasil; in 2013, the character Ernest in Joia Rara; and in 2015 the villain Gibson Stewart in A Regra do Jogo.

Personal life
He has five children, with three different partners. His first child, Rodrigo, died in an accident in 1992, at age 21. He also has four grandchildren. In early 2013, he declared he is bisexual, then in a few days later he tweeted he is not bi but poly instead.

On March 8, 2019, he was jokingly proclaimed as "president" of the Federative Republic of Brazil in an act of protest at Galeao Airport near Rio.

Career
Abreu performed in over 24 movies and 47 television shows, of which most are soap operas.

Filmography

Television

References

External links
 
 José de Abreu - blog

1946 births
Living people
Bisexual male actors
People from Santa Rita do Passa Quatro
Brazilian male actors
Brazilian LGBT actors
Brazilian bisexual people